Dmitri Sergeyevich Upper (born July 27, 1978) is a Kazakhstani former professional ice hockey center. He also holds Russian citizenship.

Career
Upper was selected by the New York Islanders in the 5th round (136th overall) of the 2000 NHL Entry Draft, after scoring 20 points and 50 penalty minutes in his first season in the Russian Superleague with Torpedo Nizhny Novgorod. He was traded to Ak Bars Kazan midway through the 2000–01 season, and joined Spartak Moscow the following year. He had a career high 16 goals, as well as 76 penalty minutes in his first year with the club. He played four seasons with CSKA Moscow, scoring 27 points in 2005–06, before rejoining Spartak Moscow in 2007. He was named team captain in 2009, and had 30 points that season, but was traded to Atlant Moscow Oblast in the 2010 offseason. Injuries limited his productivity in his first season with the team. In 2012, he joined Kazakhstan team Barys Astana.

International career
Upper has represented his native Kazakhstan in multiple tournaments, including the 1996 and 1997 IIHF World U20 Championship, the Ice Hockey World Championships in 2004, 2005 and 2011, and the 2006 Winter Olympics.

Career statistics

Regular season and playoffs

International

References

External links

1978 births
Ak Bars Kazan players
Barys Astana captains
Barys Nur-Sultan players
Expatriate ice hockey players in Russia
Atlant Moscow Oblast players
HC CSKA Moscow players
HC Spartak Moscow players
Ice hockey players at the 2006 Winter Olympics
Kazakhstani ice hockey centres
Kazakhstani people of German descent
Kazzinc-Torpedo players
Living people
New York Islanders draft picks
Olympic ice hockey players of Kazakhstan
Sportspeople from Oskemen
Torpedo Nizhny Novgorod players
Asian Games gold medalists for Kazakhstan
Medalists at the 1999 Asian Winter Games
Medalists at the 2011 Asian Winter Games
Ice hockey players at the 1999 Asian Winter Games
Ice hockey players at the 2011 Asian Winter Games
Asian Games medalists in ice hockey